This is a list of candidates of the 1984 New South Wales state election. The election was held on 24 March 1984.

Retiring Members

Labor
 Don Day MLA (Clarence)
 Roger Degen MLA (Balmain)
 Vince Durick MLA (Lakemba)
 Jack Ferguson MLA (Merrylands)
 Pat Flaherty MLA (Granville)
 Lin Gordon MLA (Murrumbidgee)
 Keith O'Connell MLA (Peats)
 Eric Ramsay (Wollongong)
 Don Burton MLC
 Roy Turner MLC

Liberal
 David Arblaster MLA (Mosman)
 Fred Duncan MLC
 Derek Freeman MLC
 John Holt MLC
 Nathanael Orr MLC
 Bill Sandwith MLC

National
 Jack Boyd MLA (Byron)
 Ron Brewer MLA (Goulburn)
 Jim Brown MLA (Oxley)
 Bill Kennedy MLC

Legislative Assembly
Sitting members are shown in bold text. Successful candidates are highlighted in the relevant colour. Where there is possible confusion, an asterisk (*) is also used.

Legislative Council
Sitting members are shown in bold text. Tickets that elected at least one MLC are highlighted in the relevant colour. Successful candidates are identified by an asterisk (*).

See also
 Members of the New South Wales Legislative Assembly, 1984–1988
 Members of the New South Wales Legislative Council, 1984–1988

References
 
 The Sydney Morning Herald. 

1984